Kenya Summer Moore (born January 24, 1971) is an American actress, model, producer, author, television personality, and entrepreneur. She is best known for winning the Miss USA pageant in 1993 and being a main cast member on Bravo's reality series, The Real Housewives of Atlanta, starring in its fifth season since 2012.

Moore rose to prominence in 1993 after winning the Miss USA contest, and placing in the top six of that year's Miss Universe pageant. She was the second black woman to be crowned Miss USA, after Carole Gist, and she holds the distinction of being the first dark-skinned woman to win the contest. She subsequently appeared in films and television shows including Waiting To Exhale (1995), Deliver Us from Eva (2003), The Steve Harvey Show (1998) and Girlfriends (2004).

Since 2012, Moore has starred in the Bravo series The Real Housewives of Atlanta, one of the most consistently highly rated reality programmes and has been claimed as "one of the best housewives of all time." She was also a member of the cast of The Celebrity Apprentice in 2015, a contestant on Dancing with the Stars and part of the first The Real Housewives Ultimate Girls Trip cast, both in 2021. Moore has produced several film projects, had a book published, and starred in her own exercise video. She is also known for her involvement in entrepreneurial ventures and is the founder of a hair care brand, Kenya Moore Hair.

Early life and education
Moore was born in Detroit, Michigan to teenagers Patricia Moore and Ronald Grant, and was raised by her paternal grandmother Doris Grant(1931–2017) and aunt after her mother abandoned her at three days old. The reality TV show star revealed that her mother never named her. "Since birth, my mother made the decision at age 16 to pretend she never had me. She has never spoken to me," Kenya wrote. "Even if present in the same room with other people and family, she pretends that I simply don't exist. She pretends I'm invisible," Kenya revealed on her Bravo blog. Moore graduated from Cass Technical High School in 1989. While still in high school, Moore experienced domestic violence from a much older boyfriend. In Moore's words, "He tormented me physically, mentally and once even nearly killed me by putting me into the hospital, from attacking me with a finger nail file… stabbing me with a finger nail file."
Moore attended Wayne State University, where she majored in psychology and minored in communication.

Career

Modeling and pageants
Moore began modeling at the age of 14 and in the course of her modeling career was the January 1992 cover girl for Chicago-based Johnson Publishing Company's Ebony Man's (EM) magazine. She also became a model for the Ebony Fashion Fair cosmetic line. At 22, Moore won Miss Michigan USA (1993) and then became the second African American woman to win Miss USA. She then represented the United States in the Miss Universe 1993 pageant and placed in the top six.

Film and television

Acting
Moore had parts in television programs including:  The Fresh Prince of Bel-Air, Meet the Browns,  Homeboys in Outer Space, Sparks, Smart Guy, Video Soul Living Single, Damon,   In the House, The Jamie Foxx Show, The Parent 'Hood, The Steve Harvey Show, Martin, Nubian Goddess, Men, Women & Dogs, The Parkers, Under One Roof, and   Girlfriends. She has also appeared on the covers of Glamour, Seventeen, Ebony, and Essence magazines and can be seen in the music videos for Jermaine Dupri's "Money Ain't a Thang" (1998),  Nas's "Street Dreams" (1996), Shai's "I Don't Wanna Be Alone" (1996), and  Tupac's "Temptations". Additionally, Moore has appeared in several films: Waiting to Exhale (1995), Senseless (1998), Trois (2000), Deliver Us from Eva (2003), Brothers in Arms (2005),  Cloud 9 (2006), I Know Who Killed Me (2007), and Trapped: Haitian Nights (2010).

Reality television
In May 2012, Moore joined the season five cast of Bravo's The Real Housewives of Atlanta. In 2015, Moore was cast on The Celebrity Apprentice 7. Moore starred in The Real Housewives Ultimate Girls Trip a spin-off featuring various women from The Real Housewives franchise, that premiered on Peacock in November 2021.

In September 2021, Moore was announced as one of the celebrities competing on season 30 of Dancing with the Stars. She and her professional dance partner, Brandon Armstrong, were the sixth couple to be eliminated, ultimately finishing in 10th place.

Production
Moore has also produced and directed various projects and launched her own company, Moore Vision Media in 2008. Moore Vision Media produced the erotic thriller "The Confidant". Moore is credited as producer/director of the film Trapped: Haitian Nights.  After the project lost its director, Moore took over the production and completed the film.  When the film failed to find distribution, Moore founded Moore Vision Media, an independent movie production and home-video distribution company.  The company's first production was The Confidant, released by Universal Vivendi on August 24, 2010.

Authoring
On November 28, 2007, Moore published a book titled Game, Get Some!: What Women Really Want. Described as a how-to guide, the book is a self-help and conduct containing relationship advice, as well as the author's personal experiences regarding interpersonal and intimate relationships. Moore has stated about the book, "No one man can know everything there is to know about women, but with my help, they may just come close; I feel like the female Ms. Hitch! I want to bring us together not apart." The author reviews self-esteem and self-concept issues, offers sexual advice, discusses tips on mending a relationship or the proper way to break up. "If you have shared a special bond with someone you have dated, if you always treat her with respect, you will always have a friend at the end of the day." Moore writes.

Exercise video and hair care line
In 2013, Moore released her own exercise video, named "Kenya Moore: Booty Boot Camp". This venture rivalled The Real Housewives of Atlanta co-star Phaedra Parks own workout video and was a primary storyline in the show's fifth season. In 2014, Moore launched a hair care products brand, Kenya Moore Haircare. Kenya Moore Haircare, designed to grow your real hair longer, stronger & thicker in just one use. Featuring products for all hair types that are sulfate, phosphate & paraben free. And over 95% naturally derived.

Personal life
In June 2017, Moore married businessman and restaurant owner Marc Daly. In April 2018 she announced that they were expecting their first child. On November 4, 2018, Moore gave birth to a daughter. Their daughter is named after Brooklyn, where she and husband Marc met, and Doris, after her late grandmother who raised her. Moore filed for divorce from Daly in August 2021.

Filmography

Film/Movie

Television

Music Videos

Awards and nominations

References

External links

Kenya Moore's Official Website
Game, Get Some! on Amazon.com
Trois – Box Office Mojo

1971 births
Actresses from Detroit
African-American actresses
American film actresses
American television actresses
Cass Technical High School alumni
Living people
Miss Universe 1993 contestants
Miss USA 1993 delegates
Miss USA winners
The Real Housewives of Atlanta
The Real Housewives cast members
Wayne State University alumni
African-American beauty pageant winners
The Apprentice (franchise) contestants
20th-century American people
20th-century African-American women
20th-century African-American people
21st-century African-American people
21st-century African-American women